Partner is also a surname. Notable people with the surname include:

 Andy Partner (born 1974), English footballer
 David Partner (born 1956), British portrait photographer
 Peter Partner (1924–2015), British historian

See also
 Partner (disambiguation)